Gull Lake is a lake located southeast of McKeever, New York. Fish species present in the lake are yellow perch, and brown bullhead. There is carry down access off Woodhull Road on the northwest shore.

References

Lakes of Herkimer County, New York
Lakes of New York (state)